Marius Cathrinus Backer (25 June 1866  –  19 February 1960)  was a Norwegian judge.

He was born in Drammen to timber trader Lars Zacharias Backer and Hanna Schwartz. 
He graduated as cand.jur. in 1888, and was named as a Supreme Court Justice from 1911 to 1936. He was decorated Knight, First Class of the Order of St. Olav in 1929.

References

Supreme Court of Norway justices
1866 births
1960 deaths
People from Drammen